A telephony service provider, as defined in Microsoft's TAPI specification, is a software interface to a physical telephony device (such as a modem) that can be accessed programmatically to perform actions such as dialing a phone number or logging a call. TSPs can be thought of as a TAPI specific driver for a telephony device.

For example Windows 10 supplies:
 hidphone.tsp
 kmddsp.tsp (kernel mode device driver)
 remotesp.tsp
 unimdm.tsp (universal modem)

External links
Microsoft Telephony Service Provider Documentation
Business Telephone System

Telephony
Microsoft application programming interfaces